Desivojca is a village in the municipality of Kamenica, in the east of Kosovo. It has  of land, 89 houses with 755 inhabitants (sources from 1995).
The village has a primary school called "Kadri Zeka" and a mosque built in 1816. It is a center for surrounding villages.

Geography
In the north it borders with the village of Huruglica, in north-east it borders with the village of Terstena, in the east is situated the village of Zarbinca and Pribovc, from south-east, south and west it is enclosed with the Laqiq village and in north-west is situated the village of Veleglava. Desivojca is a hilly mountainous area, with beautiful landscapes and developed vegetation. A river called Desivojca flows amidst dividing the village in two parts.

The highest peaks in this village are:
 Drumi i Xheles,
 Rrafshi,
 Strajdeja,
 Maja e Zezë,
 Maja e Sreshnjes 1070m,
 Cipeli 1037m,
 and the lowest attitude in Desivojca is Mulliri i Robajve 660m.

Demographics
Desivojca has four main neighborhoods: Komani, Bunjaku, Padina and Zhigolli.

There are 12 main groups of families that live in Desivojca:
 Shkodra family,
 Bunjaku,
 Dragobuzhda,
 Mellova,
 Beshtica,
 Gurguroci,
 Gagica,
 Surdulli,
 Klaiqi
 Rukoci
 Bajraliu
 Robelli

Many inhabitants from this village now live in urban centers like Gjilan, Kamenica, Pristina, and Ferizaj.

Gallery

Notes and references 

Notes:

References:

Villages in Kamenica, Kosovo